The Max Roach Quartet featuring Hank Mobley was the debut album by American jazz drummer Max Roach featuring tracks recorded in 1953 and first released on the Debut label as a 10-inch LP.

Reception

Allmusic awarded the album 3½ stars and its review by Scott Yanow states, "Drummer Max Roach's first studio session as a leader falls stylewise between bop and hard bop... The music is enjoyable although not as essential as the great drummer's later dates".

Track listing
All compositions by Max Roach except as indicated
 "Cou-Manchi-Cou" - 3:01	
 "Just One of Those Things" (Cole Porter) - 3:08	
 "The Glow Worm" (Paul Lincke, Johnny Mercer, Lilla C Robinson) - 2:27 Bonus track on 12 inch LP	
 "Mobleyzation" (Hank Mobley) - 2:42 Bonus track on 12 inch LP	
 "Chi-Chi" (Charlie Parker) - 2:58	
 "Kismet" (Mobley) - 2:39	
 "I'm a Fool to Want You" (Joel Herron, Frank Sinatra, Jack Wolf) - 3:13	
 "Sfax" - 2:17 Bonus track on 12 inch LP	
 "Orientation" (Mobley) - 2:50	 Bonus track on 12 inch LP
 "Drum Conversation" - 2:42	
 "Drum Conversation Part 2" - 4:38 Bonus track on CD reissue
Recorded in New York City on April 10, 1953 (tracks 3, 4, 8 & 9) and April 21, 1953 (tracks 1, 2, 5-7, 10 & 11)

Personnel 
Max Roach - drums
Hank Mobley - tenor saxophone (tracks 1-9)
Walter Davis, Jr. - piano (tracks 1-9)
Franklin Skeete - bass (tracks 1-9)
Idrees Sulieman - trumpet (tracks 3, 4, 8 & 9) 
Leon Comegys - trombone (tracks 3, 4, 8 & 9) 
Gigi Gryce - alto saxophone  (tracks 3, 4, 8 & 9)

References 

1954 albums
Max Roach albums
Hank Mobley albums
Debut Records albums